Muhammad B. S. Jallow is a Gambian politician, who serves as Vice President of the Gambia since February 2023. 

Prior to assuming the vice presidency, Jallow was a civil servant.

Political career
Jallow was appointed to his current position by President Adama Barrow following the death of incumbent Badara Joof on 17 January 2023.

References 

Year of birth missing (living people)
Living people
Vice-presidents of the Gambia